The name Denise has been used for four tropical cyclones world wide, three in the Eastern Pacific Ocean and one in the South-West Indian Ocean. It also has been used in one European windstorm.

 Tropical Storm Denise (1967), weak tropical storm that never threatened land
 Hurricane Denise (1971), Category 4 hurricane that remained in the open ocean
 Hurricane Denise (1975), Category 4 hurricane that did not come near land

In the South-West Indian Ocean:
 Tropical Cyclone Denise (1966), passed north of Mauritius and then crossed over Réunion 
In Europe:

 Storm Denise (2022)

See also

 List of storms named Dennis, a similar name

Pacific hurricane set index articles
South-West Indian Ocean cyclone set index articles